Gcobani Bobo (born 12 September 1979) is a former South African rugby player, rugby commentator and author. His preferred position was centre, although he had played wing on numerous occasions, with some success due to his pace. Bobo played for the Golden Lions, Sharks, Western Province, Newcastle Falcons, Cats, Sharks and the Stormers.

In 2015 he co-wrote a rugby thriller novel titled The Rise of the Dagger - What Happens in a Rugby Story When Life Interrupts?

Career
Bobo started his career as a flanker, until then Bok coach Nick Mallet suggested that Bobo should shift from the side of the scrum to the midfield.  Bobo was selected for the South African U-19 side in 1998 and then spent two years playing for the Golden Lions U-21 outfit.  His performances in the then Bankfin Currie Cup earned him selection to the SA 'A' team in 2001.
When he was elevated to Super Rugby, he was ready.  The burly centre scored a hat-trick on debut against the Bulls, and looked set for full Springbok colours before a knee injury at the House of Pain put paid to his short-term ambitions.

Bobo was considered to have a good chance of selection for the 2003 World Cup, but he tore his anterior cruciate ligament in a warm-up encounter – having been named in Rudolf Straeuli's squad.  Jake White realised Bobo's potential and tested him on the Vodacom Outgoing Tour in 2004. But Bobo had lost some of his enthusiasm and he lacked pace.

Given a second chance by Rassie Erasmus, Bobo returned home to the Cape to play for the Stormers Super 14 team and has rediscovered the form that made him a Bok, partnering Jean de Villiers.  At the conclusion of the 2009 season, like de Villiers Bobo left, signing for an overseas team, Newcastle Falcons.

Author 
In 2015, Gcobani alongside Elvis Jack published a rugby thriller novel titled The Rise of the Dagger - What Happens in a Rugby Story When Life Interrupts?

The book narrates the life of Xolile Dalindyebo, a South African Xhosa rugby player who mysteriously speaks Japanese as well. Xolile fast becomes highly successful as player due to his talent and scheming. But his new found success is at the mercy of his scandalous and hidden past in Japan.

Publications 
The Rise of the Dagger. Lulu Press, Inc, 2016.

References

Sources
"South African centre Gcobani Bobo joins Newcastle Falcons." The Guardian. 3 July 2009.

South Africa international rugby union players
1979 births
Living people
Sportspeople from Qonce
Alumni of Rondebosch Boys' High School
Golden Lions players
Lions (United Rugby Championship) players
Sharks (Currie Cup) players
Sharks (rugby union) players
Western Province (rugby union) players
Stormers players
South Africa international rugby sevens players
Newcastle Falcons players
Rugby union players from the Eastern Cape
Rugby union centres
Rugby union wings